Henry Bentley Hancock (late 1874 – 1924) was an English professional footballer. An inside left or centre forward, he played in the Football League for  Blackpool, Oldham Athletic and  West Bromwich Albion, but was also on the books of Stockport County and  Manchester City.

Club career
Born in Levenshulme, Hancock began his career with Cheshire club Melrose, followed by a stint with Port Sunlight. After a spell with Stockport County, he joined Blackpool, then under the managership of club secretary Tom Barcroft. In his one season with "the Seasiders", in 1905–06, he was the club's joint-top scorer in the League, alongside Jimmy Connor and an E. Francis, with six goals. Blackpool never lost when Hancock scored. He also scored three goals in that season's FA Cup, as Blackpool made it to the Third Round, to become the outright top scorer.

In 1907, Hancock joined Oldham Athletic. He scored seven goals in 27 League appearances for "the Latics". Later that year he signed for Manchester City but did not make any League appearances for them. He joined West Bromwich Albion in 1908, making two League appearances for "the Baggies". He finished his career with Brierley Hill Alliance in the West Midlands.

Further reading

1874 births
1924 deaths
People from Levenshulme
English footballers
Association football forwards
Port Sunlight F.C. players
Stockport County F.C. players
Blackpool F.C. players
Oldham Athletic A.F.C. players
Manchester City F.C. players
West Bromwich Albion F.C. players
Brierley Hill Alliance F.C. players
English Football League players